Juniperus recurva, commonly named the Himalayan juniper or drooping juniper, is a juniper native to the Himalaya, from northern Pakistan, through India, Nepal and Bhutan, to western Yunnan in southwestern China.

Description

The cones are berry-like, globose to ovoid, 5–10 mm long and 4–7 mm diameter, glossy blue-black, and contain one seed; they are mature in about 18 months. The male cones are 3–4 mm long, and shed their pollen in early spring. It is largely monoecious with pollen and seed cones produced on the same plants.

Varieties
There are two varieties, treated as distinct species by some botanists:
Juniperus recurva var. recurva - leaves mostly 5–8 mm. Throughout the range.
Juniperus recurva var. coxii - leaves mostly 7–10 mm. Confined to the eastern Himalaya on high rainfall sites.

Cultivation
Juniperus recurva is planted as an ornamental tree in western Europe, valued for its drooping foliage, particularly pendulous in the cultivar 'Castlewellan'.

References

 
Adams, R. P. Junipers of the World: The genus Juniperus. Victoria: Trafford, 2004.

External links
 Gymnosperm Database — Juniperus recurva

recurva
Flora of Pakistan
Flora of Yunnan
Flora of China
Flora of Assam (region)
Flora of East Himalaya
Flora of Nepal
Flora of West Himalaya
Garden plants of Asia
Ornamental trees